The One in the Middle Is the Green Kangaroo is a children's book published in 1969, written by Judy Blume and featuring different illustrations over multiple editions. It was Blume's first published work.

Plot

The story follows second-grader Freddy Dissel --a middle child-- who feels emotionally squashed between his older brother (Mike) and his younger sister (Ellen). Mike got new clothes and Freddy was forced to wear Mike's old clothes. As for Ellen (Freddy's younger sister), even though Freddy used to have his own room, he was forced to bunk with --share a room-- with Mike. Because Ellen (his younger sister) moved into his --Freddy's-- old bedroom. On Mike, Freddy tried to join Mike and his friends. But Mike said that Freddy was getting in his way. On Ellen, Freddy tried to play with her (Ellen). Ellen did not know how to play Freddy's way. And while Freddy played with blocks, Ellen messed up Freddy's blocks. Freddy got mad (because Ellen knocked down his blocks) and he pinched Ellen. And Ellen, she cried. He does not seem to get much attention, until he lands a role in a school play as a green kangaroo.

Publication history
The book was originally published in 1969 by the Reilly & Lee imprint of the Henry Regnery Company with illustrations by Lois Axeman. It has been reissued multiple times, first in 1981 with revised text and new illustrations by Amy Aitken published by the Bradbury Press and the Yearling imprint of Dell Publishing. It was again reissued by Dell in 1991 with new illustrations by Irene Trivas, and finally in 2014 by Simon & Schuster with illustrations by Debbie Ridpath Ohi.

References

External links
Judy Blume's website

1969 children's books
American picture books
Books by Judy Blume